Svetly is a town in Kaliningrad Oblast, Russia, located on the Sambia Peninsula on the coast of Vistula Lagoon,  west of Kaliningrad. Population:   21,745 (2002 Census);

Geography
The town is located on the bank of the Kaliningrad sea shipping channel connecting Kaliningrad with the Baltic Sea.

History

The first mention of the predecessor settlement of Zimmerbude dates back to a 15th-century chronicle of the Teutonic Knights. However, even earlier, in a manuscript from Fischhausen of 1305, there is a mention of the peninsula of Payziev ("Poyzart" - the area in the forest Poyz), from which the Teutonic Knights invaded the Old Prussians' territory in the first half of the 13th century. The 15th-century castle, which originally belonged to the bishops of Sambia, has not survived. In 1454, King Casimir IV Jagiellon incorporated the region to the Kingdom of Poland upon the request of the anti-Teutonic Prussian Confederation. After the subsequent Thirteen Years' War (1454–1466), it became a part of Poland as a fief held by the Teutonic Knights until 1525, and by secular Ducal Prussia afterwards. The modern settlement was founded in 1640. After the confiscation of church property the estate passed to Oswald von Taubenhaym, who owned it until 1661.

In 1669, the manor was given to Eberhard von Danckelmann, a former tutor of King Frederick I, as a reward. From the 18th century, the village formed part of the Kingdom of Prussia. Around 1720, the village comprised 16 estates, 12 peasants and about the same number of fishermen whose main occupation was fishing, mainly for their own needs.

After the castle ceased to exist for a long time villagers eked out a miserable existence of subsistence by fishing. Apart from a few acidified meadows they had no land, and therefore almost never held cattle. Their home were extremely cramped and dirty, smoke coming out of the centers through kamyshoyve roof sagged and a thick layer of soot on the walls through the kitchen. Long winter evenings in the huts burning torch, making the faces of the inhabitants were constantly black. Clothes spun, wove, and sewed himself. This adds another life flood, which were repeated from year to year.

Religion played an important role in village life: conducting religious rites, services, etc. For a long time there was no church in the village, so it belonged to the parish church of Medena (Logvino). But because of bad roads, the villagers could visit the church in Medena only a few times during their lives. Baptisms of children and weddings took place there, as well as major feasts when the weather was fine. The rest of the strongly expressed religious feelings of people meet as a church sermons, which were held in the school building. And from April 1, 1901 and Tsimmerbude with neighboring villages and Payziev Nepleken 1,500 residents formed their own church community and bought a small church, which two years earlier Medena built in Tsimmerbude as its branch.

From 1871, the village also formed part of Germany, within which it was administratively located in the province of East Prussia. In the 1920s, a new school was built and before World War II Zimmerbude was a rather busy, though small village. There was a shop, a restaurant, a bakery, and the "Valdshloskhen" inn, which name translates to "Forest castle house". The number of pre-war inhabitants was 742 people.

During World War II, no military operations took place directly on the territory of the present-day town of Svetly. The war ended for the village in April 1945, leaving no significant destruction, and it passed to the Soviet Union. In 1947 it was renamed Svetly. On June 17, 1947 by the Decree of the Presidium of the Supreme Soviet of the RSFSR a rural council based in Svetly was founded as part of the Primorsky district. It was transformed into a workers settlement by the decision of the Kaliningrad Oblast Executive Committee No 758 of August 1, 1949. On October 6, 1955 by decision of the Presidium of the Supreme Soviet the workers settlement was transformed into a town of regional subordination, which became a centre of the Svetlovsky Urban Okrug in 2008.

Administrative and municipal status
Within the framework of administrative divisions, it is, together with ten rural localities, incorporated as the town of oblast significance of Svetly—an administrative unit with the status equal to that of the districts. As a municipal division, the town of oblast significance of Svetly is incorporated as Svetlovsky Urban Okrug.

Climate
The climate is influenced by the prevailing air mass with Atlantic Ocean to the mainland and is characterized as a transition to the sea with mild winters with little snow, relatively cold spring, moderately warm summers and warm wet autumn. Average annual air temperature - .

The average temperature in January - . There are 86 days per year with frost. Severe frosts are rare. In general, unstable weather patterns and is associated mainly with a predominance of marine air masses with high repeatability accompanying Cyclones (storms).

Moist air masses coming from the Atlantic Ocean, cause high relative humidity, which is winter and fall 85-87 %, decreasing by early summer to 72-73 %. High humidity and a large cloudy significantly affect the features (reduction) of the Svetly regime.

During the year, is celebrated around 150 overcast and only 30 clear days. In an average year recorded 74 days with fogs, mainly fogs in winter. They are accompanied by drizzle, rain and snow. In the winter months falls only 8-10% of annual precipitation. Snow depth is small - .

The study area generally refers to the area of active wind activity. The wind regime is characterized by a predominance of winds south, western areas with a repeatability of 35%, as well as the southern and south -eastern areas with a repeatability of 23%. Has the highest rate of wind. The number of days with strong winds (storms) at speeds exceeding  up to 10–15 days.

Economy

"Lukoil - Kaliningradmorneft": oil terminal (storage, transfer of liquid petroleum products), steel plant (production of marine steel structures);
JSC "Sodrujestvo -Soja" - deep processing of oil-bearing crops;
JSC "Jantarenergo" (GRES - 2) - heat production;
LLC «Vivo-Porte» - production of interior doors;
OOO "Optim - Kran" - production gantry and bridge cranes;
OOO "NPO Speckran" - production gantry and bridge cranes;
OOO "Regio - Express" - passenger transport;
Rybkolhoz "Za Rodinu" - fishing and fish processing;
JSC "Svetly predprijatie "Era" - produces electrical work, repair of electrical equipment, electrical parameter measurements, ship repair river and maritime registers;
OGUP "Zapremmash" - ship repair and manufacturing, fish processing equipment;
JSC "Mezhkolhoznaja proizvodstvennaja baza" - ship repair, port services, maintenance and supply of the fishing fleet;
JSC "Sudoremontnik Baltica" - ship repair, port services;
JSC "BaltNafta" - handling of oil products;
OOO "Kreon" - shredding fish canned;

Transportation
The station is located in svetly Baltic Forest Kaliningrad railway. The station belongs to a dead-end branch branched from the railway line Kaliningrad - Baltiysk.  Svetly is not served by passenger trains.
Distance to Kaliningrad - , Khrabrovo Airport - .

Sights
Church of the Annunciation
Temple of the Holy Great Martyr Barbara.
Monument to Lenin.
Monument to soldiers-internationalists.
Monument to the liquidators of the Chernobyl accident.
Church of the Apostles Paul and Gleb.

Notable people
Eberhard von Danckelmann - Brandenburg statesman.
Matveev, Maxim - Russian film and theater actor.
Evans, Edgar Yanisovich - master of sports of international class rowing sports.
Dmitri Rozinkevich - Honored Master of Sports of Russia.
Bokhonov, Victor F. - Soviet and Russian actor of theater, film and dubbing.

Twin towns and sister cities

Svetly is twinned with:
 Kętrzyn, Poland
 Nowy Dwór Gdański, Poland
 Lida, Belarus
 Karlshamn, Sweden

Former twin towns
 Świnoujście, Poland (terminated by Świnoujście city authorities as a response to the 2022 Russian invasion of Ukraine)

References

Notes

Sources

Cities and towns in Kaliningrad Oblast